Pilosella officinarum (synonym Hieracium pilosella), known as mouse-ear hawkweed, is a yellow-flowered species of flowering plant in the daisy family Asteraceae, native to Europe and northern Asia. It produces single, lemon-coloured inflorescences. Like most hawkweed species, it is highly variable and is a member of a species complex of several dozens of subspecies and hundreds of varieties and forms. It is an allelopathic plant.

Description 
It is a hispid (hairy) perennial plant, with a basal rosette of leaves. The whole plant, with the exception of the flower parts, is covered in glandular hairs, usually whitish, sometimes reddish on the stem. Their underside is tomentose (covered with hair). The flowerheads are borne singly on the scape and are a pale lemon-yellow colour, with the outermost ligules having a reddish underside. It flowers from May until August and the flowers are visited by various groups of insects, especially flies.

The plant favours dry, sunny areas. It grows well on sandy and similarly less fertile ground types. It produces stolons which generate a new rosette at their extremity, each rosette has the possibility of developing into a new clone forming dense mats in open space. It also propagates by seeds.

Ecology 
It is a known allelopathic plant, whose roots secrete several substances inhibiting root growth, including its own. It can be controlled through rotation with clover and grasses where possible.

Recent research claims that Pilosella officinarum exhibits an atavism by the reemergence of sexual reproduction.

Similar species 
Shetland mouse-ear hawkweed (Pilosella flagellaris subsp. bicapitata) is similar, but has two flowers per leaf stalk.  It is found in the  Shetland Islands only, on rocky coastal grassland. It flowers from May to August.

Cultivation and uses 
Mouse-ear hawkweed has become a common introduced invasive species in North America (where it is found in southern Canada and both north-east and north-west United States), and New Zealand. It is a level C noxious weed in the United States (with higher levels in the states of Washington and Oregon), and a weed in Quebec. It does not have special designations in other locations of Canada. It is known to be strongly invasive in New Zealand's tussock fields, where there are no native species of hawkweed, and biological control measures are being undertaken to control it and other similar species. In Victoria and NSW, Australia, Hawkweed Sp. are declared as State Prohibited Weeds and are controlled under The Bio Security Act 2015. Currently there are several eradication programs operating (often employing volunteers) to locate, prevent the spread of and eradicate any Pilosella (Hieracium) sp. plants.

Joseph Pitton de Tournefort mentions that blades covered in this plant's juices were believed to cut through stone as easily as through wood.

Phytochemistry 
The mouse-ear hawkweed contains umbelliferone, a compound similar to coumarin. The plant produces triterpenoids, mainly taraxasterol, but also the 4,4-dimethyl phytosterols alpha- and beta-amyrin, taraxerol, and fern-7en-3beta-ol. It has been used in folk medicine, and recreationally as a cannabis substitute.

Image gallery

References

External links 
 

officinarum
Flora of Asia
Medicinal plants of Asia
Medicinal plants of Europe
Flora of Europe
Plants described in 1753
Taxa named by Carl Linnaeus